This article outlines, in chronological order, the various controversies surrounding or involving the BBC.

Early years

1926 General Strike

In 1926, the General Council of the Trades Union Congress (TUC) called a General Strike to prevent wage reductions and worsening conditions for 1.2 million locked-out coal miners. Labour Party politicians such as party leader Ramsay MacDonald and Philip Snowden criticised the BBC for being "biased" and "misleading the public" during the strike.

Prime Minister Stanley Baldwin was coached by John Reith during a national broadcast about the strike which he made from Reith's house. When Ramsay MacDonald asked to make a broadcast in reply, Reith supported the request. However, Baldwin was "quite against MacDonald broadcasting" and Reith refused the request.

Baldwin's government blocked the BBC from broadcasting statements about the strike by the Labour Party and TUC leaders. When Philip Snowden, the former Labour Chancellor of the Exchequer, wrote to the Radio Times to complain about the BBC's treatment of the unions, Reith wrote that the BBC was not totally independent from the government, which had imposed some constraints on what the BBC could do. Randall Davidson, Archbishop of Canterbury, wished to broadcast a "peace appeal" to call for an immediate end to the strike, renewal of government subsidies to the coal industry and no cuts in miners' wages. Reith denied his request because he believed such a speech would be used by Winston Churchill to take over the BBC. Churchill wanted to use the BBC as a government tool during the strike. Reith wrote in his diary that the government "know they can trust us not to be really impartial".

A post-strike analysis carried out by the BBC's Programme Correspondence Department reported that of those polled, 3,696 commended the BBC's coverage, whilst 176 were critical.

Between the wars
Since 1927, there have been arguments over impartiality at the BBC. In 1927, under a Royal Charter, the BBC became a public entity for the first time – with requirements including the need for impartiality and for staff not to express opinions on controversial subject matters.

Prior to World War II, Sir John Reith excluded Winston Churchill from the BBC airwaves. At the time of the Munich Agreement of 1938, Churchill "complained that he had been very badly treated...and that he was always muzzled by the BBC".

1930s to Cold War: MI5 vetting

From the late 1930s until the end of the Cold War, MI5 had an officer at the BBC vetting editorial applicants. During World War II 'subversives', particularly suspected communists such as the folk singer Ewan MacColl, were banned from the BBC. The personnel records of anyone suspicious were stamped with a distinctively shaped green tag, or "Christmas tree;" only a handful of BBC personnel staff knew what the 'Christmas trees' meant.

1930s: Commercial radio controversy
Because the BBC had become both a monopoly and a non-commercial entity, it soon faced controversial competition from British subjects who were operating leased transmitters on the continent of Europe before World War II, to broadcast commercial radio programmes into the United Kingdom. John Reith, who had been given powers to dictate the cultural output of the BBC, retaliated by leading the opposition to these commercial stations. Controversy spilled over into the press when the British government attempted to censor the printing of their programme information. The pressure was created by the success of these stations.

1930s onwards: Broadcasting jazz
In her biography of her father, My Father: Reith of the BBC, Reith's daughter Marista Leishman said that he banned the playing of jazz music on the BBC, and that he wrote in his diary that "Germany has banned hot jazz and I'm sorry that we should be behind in dealing with this filthy product of modernity." In 2010, 19 MPs supported an early day motion  “That this House is concerned that BBC Radio devotes such little broadcasting time to jazz”    A 2015 Jazz Services study reported that jazz as a percentage of total music output was only 1.74% on Radio 2 and 3.62% on Radio 3.  In 2019 the BBC announced cutbacks in jazz programming at the BBC.  In January 2023, it was reported that the jazz page would no longer appear in every edition of BBC Music Magazine.

Post-war

1950s: Claimed involvement in Iranian coup d'état
A BBC Radio 4 documentary in 2005 claimed that it had evidence that a radio newsreader inserted the word "exactly" into a midnight timecheck one summer night in 1953, as "It is now exactly midnight", a code word to the Shah of Iran that Britain supported his plans for a coup. The shah had selected the word, the documentary said, and the BBC broadcast the word at the request of the government. Officially, the BBC has never acknowledged the code word plot. The BBC spokesman declined to comment on a possible connection.

1950s: Independent television controversy
Winston Churchill's government passed the Television Act 1954 that permitted the creation of the first commercial television network in Britain, ITV. This was criticised in the House of Lords by, among others, Lord Reith. Churchill explained to his doctor, Lord Moran: "I am against the monopoly enjoyed by the BBC. For eleven years they kept me off the air. They prevented me from expressing views which have proved to be right. Their behaviour has been tyrannical. They are honeycombed with Socialists—probably with Communists".

1965: The War Game
The War Game, directed by Peter Watkins, is a pseudo-documentary recounting the aftermath of a fictional attack on London with a one-megaton nuclear bomb. Intended for the twentieth anniversary on 6 August 1965 of the dropping of the bomb on Hiroshima, The War Game was banned by the BBC, which said it was "too horrifying for the medium of broadcasting". The chairman of the BBC board of governors, Lord Normanbrook, wrote in a secret letter to the cabinet secretary, Burke Trend, that "The showing of the film on television might have a significant effect on public attitudes towards the policy of the nuclear deterrent". Although given a limited cinema release by the British Film Institute (BFI), and awarded an Oscar as Best Documentary, the film was not screened by the BBC until 1985.

In 2012, John Pilger wrote that, in banning Watkins' film, the BBC was performing "the function of the state broadcaster as a cornerstone of Britain's ruling elite".

1960s
Mary Whitehouse launched her 'Clean Up TV campaign' in April 1964. In her view, Hugh Greene as BBC Director General was "more than anybody else ... responsible for the moral collapse in this country." The campaign of Whitehouse and her supporters soon became the National Viewers' and Listeners' Association; Mrs Whitehouse was opposed to the policies of liberalisation pursued by Greene and largely sustained by his successors at the Corporation. Whitehouse's campaign focused much more on the BBC than on ITV, and she had a high public profile for several decades. The tabloid press also criticised the BBC for what it perceived as lapses in programming quality.

In 1969, Reuters agreed to open a reporting service in the Middle East as part of a British Foreign Office plan to influence the international media. In order to protect the reputation of Reuters, which may have been damaged if the funding from the British government became known, the BBC paid Reuters “enhanced subscriptions” for access to its news service, and was in turn compensated by the British government for the extra expense. The BBC paid Reuters £350,000 over four years under the plan.

1971: Yesterday's Men
Yesterday's Men is a BBC documentary first broadcast in June 1971 about the former ministers of Harold Wilson's Labour government who were now experiencing opposition. The approach of the programme makers, who included reporter David Dimbleby, angered Wilson and the Labour Party who saw it as displaying explicit Conservative bias. According to the official History of the BBC web page on the incident, the Labour politicians were "effectively tricked into taking part in a programme that would ridicule them". During his own interview Wilson was asked by Dimbleby, in an untransmitted section of their encounter, about the money he had made from his memoirs, a question which led to a furious exchange between them. Wilson wanted the programme shelved, but it was broadcast with minor changes.

1979: Panorama
In November 1979, Panorama showed masked IRA men manning a roadblock in Carrickmore. The Army and the Royal Ulster Constabulary withdrew their cooperation immediately and the Unionist leader James Molyneaux claimed that the filming was "at least a treasonable activity". The BBC governors issued a statement which blamed the Panorama team and admitted that the filming of the IRA roadblock "would appear to be a clear breach of standing instructions in relation to filming in Ireland". In the House of Commons the Conservative MP Tim Eggar requested that the Prime Minister, Margaret Thatcher, "contact the governors of the BBC to express extreme concern about the way in which the Panorama team seems to have encouraged the IRA to break the law in Northern Ireland". Thatcher replied that the government contacted the BBC about the programme: "My hon. Friend will know that this is not the first time that we have had occasion to raise similar matters with the BBC. My right hon. Friend the Home Secretary and I think that it is time that the BBC put its house in order".

1980–1990

1982: Falklands War
During the Falklands War, the Prime Minister Margaret Thatcher and some Conservative MPs believed that the BBC was excessively even-handed between Britain and Argentina, referring to "the British" and "the Argentines" instead of "our forces" and "the enemy".

On 2 May, during a report for Newsnight, Peter Snow remarked: "Until the British are demonstrated either to be deceiving us or to be concealing losses, we can only tend to give a lot more credence to the British version of events". The Conservative MP John Page complained that the programme was "totally offensive and almost treasonable". Answering a question from Page on 6 May, Thatcher said that "many people are very concerned indeed that the case for our British forces is not being put over fully and effectively. I understand that there are times when it seems that we and the Argentines are being treated almost as equals and almost on a neutral basis. I understand that there are occasions when some commentators will say that the Argentines did something and then "the British" did something. I can only say that if this is so it gives offence and causes great emotion among many people". The Sun newspaper published an editorial on 7 May titled "Dare Call it Treason: There are Traitors in Our Midst" which criticised Snow. The Daily Mirror came to Snow's defence in an editorial titled 'The Harlot of Fleet Street', calling The Sun "coarse and demented" and that it had "fallen from the gutter to the sewer...The Sun today is to journalism what Dr Joseph Goebbels was to truth".

The 10 May edition of Panorama (titled "Can We Avoid War?") also provoked outrage. The day after it was broadcast, the Conservative MP Sally Oppenheim asked Thatcher in the Commons: "Is she aware that for the most part, but not all, it was an odious, subversive, travesty in which Michael Cockerell and other BBC reporters dishonoured the right to freedom of speech in this country?" Thatcher responded: "I share the deep concern that has been expressed on many sides, particularly about the content of yesterday evening's "Panorama" programme. I know how strongly many people feel that the case for our country is not being put with sufficient vigour on certain—I do not say all—BBC programmes. The chairman of the BBC has assured us, and has said in vigorous terms, that the BBC is not neutral on this point, and I hope that his words will be heeded by the many who have responsibilities for standing up for our task force, our boys, our people and the cause of democracy".

According to the commander of the British Naval Task Force, Sandy Woodward, while the British were preparing to land on San Carlos the BBC World Service broadcast that the Battle Group and Amphibious Group of the Task Force had joined up. Woodward later wrote: "I had hoped that this particular rendezvous at least could have remained a military secret until after the actual landing, but as ever the British media were more interested in the truth than in the consequences for our own people. We were infuriated". Some on the Task Force said that "if we got hit on the way and lost a lot of men, the Director General of the BBC should be charged with treason". Shortly before the attack on Goose Green, the BBC broadcast that an attack was imminent and that the 2 Para regiment were within five miles of Darwin. According to Woodward, there "are still some who believe that BBC report was directly responsible for the Argentinian 'ambush' in which Colonel Jones and many others died. Standing in the Ops Room of Hermes on the day the BBC effectively informed the Args of our position and bearing, I am sure we all felt the same". Thatcher later wrote: "Many of the public (including us) did not like the attitude [of the media] particularly the BBC...My concern was always the safety of our forces. Theirs was news". She was also angry about the BBC's disclosure of 2 Para's position: "Can there ever have been an army which had to fight its battles against media reporting like that?"

1984: "Maggie's Militant Tendency" controversy

In January 1984 the BBC programme Panorama broadcast "Maggie's Militant Tendency" which claimed that a number of Conservative MPs including (Neil Hamilton, Harvey Proctor and Gerald Howarth) had links to far-right organisations both in Britain and on the Continent.

The programme was based on an internal Conservative Party report compiled by Phil Pedley, Chairman of the Young Conservatives.  Panorama confirmed its status with a senior Conservative Party vice chairman. The report was formally presented to the party in the week before the programme was aired. During the making of the programme, attempts to contact some of the named MPs for comment were unsuccessful. (Hamilton's wife Christine later described how 'Neil and I had 'devised a method for making sure that Panorama personnel would not be in a position to say that Neil had refused to speak'.) The programme was vetted prior to transmission by the BBC's lawyers, by the Head of Currents Affairs Television, and by the Chief Assistant to the Director General, Margaret Douglas

Two of the MPs named in the programme (Hamilton and Howarth) sued the BBC and the programme-makers. The Director-General, Alasdair Milne, reviewed the BBC's own legal advice, and that of his Chief Assistant, and declared the programme to be 'rock solid'.  The Board of Governors (Chairman Stuart Young) also gave its backing for the programme to be defended in court. Stuart Young died in August 1986, two months before the libel case against Panorama came to trial. A new chairman, Marmaduke Hussey, had been appointed, but had not formally arrived at the BBC when the trial opened on 13 October 1986. Hussey nevertheless spoke with the BBC's barrister, Charles Grey.  Hussey says in his memoirs that 'Grey thought it unlikely the BBC would win.'  Sir Charles Grey disputes this statement, saying that 'my junior and I both thought the case was winnable'.

The first four days of the trial were given over to opening statements from Hamilton and Howarth and their lawyers, which received wide press coverage.  On the evening of the fourth day the BBC's Assistant DG Alan Protheroe informed the BBC's legal team and the named defendants that the Governors now wished to settle the case immediately. This prevented the BBC's defence from being put to the court, or known to the public.

Hamilton and Howarth were each awarded £25,000 in damages. Costs amounted to £240,000. They dropped their case against Phil Pedley.

There was controversy over the editing of one part of the programme which juxtaposed shots of Howarth wearing a train driver's uniform at a steam railway enthusiasts' rally with the claim that he had attended a fascist meeting in Italy, implying that the uniform he was wearing was a fascist one.  This issue was also not dealt with in court.

1984: Falsified coverage of miners' strike

Footage of the so-called "Battle of Orgreave" on 18 June 1984 had been filmed by a crew from the BBC. When this appeared on that evening's BBC news bulletins, it was edited and broadcast out of chronological sequence, falsely showing pickets throwing stones at the police and the police subsequently carrying out a mounted charge.

1986: Libyan raid controversy
The BBC News at Six reporting of the American bombing raid on Libya outraged Thatcher and Conservative Party Chairman Norman Tebbit because they believed it accepted the Libyan government's propaganda about civilian casualties and because it gave no airtime to American or British spokesmen to explain their governments' stances. Tebbit ordered Conservative Central Office to compile a dossier on the BBC's reporting and then to hand it to the lawyer Lord Goodman for a critique. Goodman's critique largely agreed with the dossier's findings and on 30 October Tebbit submitted it to Lord Barnett, saying that the BBC's coverage was "a mixture of news, views, speculations, error and uncritical carriage of Libyan propaganda which does serious damage to the reputation of the BBC". The BBC rejected its findings.

1986: Secret Society controversy

In 1986, BBC journalists went on strike to protest against police raids in search of evidence that a BBC television series in production, Secret Society, had endangered national security. The police searched the BBC studios in Glasgow, Scotland, the London home of investigative journalist Duncan Campbell, and the New Statesman offices.

On 12 June 1985, the controller of BBC2, Graeme MacDonald, was offered a series of documentaries by the BBC studios in Scotland in conjunction with an offer to them by Duncan Campbell whose work had previously appeared in the New Statesman magazine. The programmes were six half-hour films by Duncan Campbell (researched and presented by Campbell and produced according to BBC standards), which illuminated "hidden truths of major public concern". The six programmes were:
 One: The Secret Constitution about a small, secret Cabinet committee that was in reality the Establishment that ruled the United Kingdom.
 Two: In Time of Crisis about secret preparations for war that began in 1982 within every NATO country. This programme revealed what Britain would do.
 Three: A Gap In Our Defences about bungling defence manufacturers and incompetent military planners who have botched every new radar system that Britain has installed since World War II.
 Four: We're All Data Now about the Data Protection Act 1984.
 Five: Unfinished - about the Association of Chief Police Officers and how government policy and actions are determined in the fields of law and order.
 Six: Unfinished - about communications with particular reference to satellites.

Work began on the series. In April 1986 Alan Protheroe, acting on behalf of BBC Director General Alasdair Milne was asked for permission to bug a private detective who said he could access a Criminal Records Office computer. Permission was granted and filming took place. The police were informed and the man was subsequently charged under Section 2 of the Official Secrets Act 1911.

The sixth programme would have revealed details of a top secret spy satellite and Alisdair Milne had already decided to cut it from the line-up when The Observer newspaper broke the story on 18 January 1987 with the headline: "BBC gag on £500M defence secret". Combined with this story was a report that the Home Office intended to restrict the broadcast receiver licence fee, the implication being that the government had decided to censor BBC investigative journalism.

Soon afterwards, a series of programmes on BBC Radio Four called My Country Right or Wrong was banned by the government because it might have revealed sensitive secrets. The series was censored only a few hours before it was due to start because it dealt with similar issues to the television series concerning the British "secret state". However, it was eventually broadcast uncut, after the government decided that it did not breach any laws or interfere with national security.

1987: Sacked director general controversy
On 29 January 1987, Alasdair Milne was sacked by the newly appointed chairman of the BBC Board of Governors, Marmaduke Hussey. He was replaced by a senior BBC accountant, Michael Checkland. Milne later wrote his account of this affair in The Memoirs of a British Broadcaster.

1990–2000

1988–1994: Sinn Féin broadcast ban

On 19 October 1988, Conservative Home Secretary Douglas Hurd under Prime Minister Margaret Thatcher issued a notice under clause 13(4) of the BBC Licence and Agreement to the BBC and under section 29(3) of the Broadcasting Act 1981 to the Independent Broadcasting Authority prohibiting the broadcast of direct statements by representatives or supporters of eleven Irish political and military organisations. The ban lasted until 1994, and denied the UK news media the right to broadcast the voices, though not the words, of all Irish republican and loyalist paramilitaries, while the ban was targeted primarily at Sinn Féin.

Government intimidation and laws before the ban had already resulted in forms of self-censorship. An INLA interview in July 1979 on BBC's Tonight caused a controversy involving Prime Minister Thatcher and was the last time such an interview was heard on British television. The 1980 Panorama film of the IRA on patrol in Carrickmore was seized by police under the Prevention of Terrorism Acts following an outcry in parliament and the press. In 1985 an edition of BBC's Real Lives series ("At the Edge of the Union") was temporarily withdrawn under government pressure. BBC governors found themselves in conflict with management and the corporation's journalists went on strike for a day. The programme was later transmitted with minor changes.

Coverage of Sinn Féin by the BBC before the ban was minimal. In 1988 Sinn Féin was only heard or seen on television 93 times, had only 17 of the 633 formal BBC interviews as compared to 121 interviews with the Conservative Party and 172 with the Royal Ulster Constabulary and the civil service, and were never interviewed in the studio like many other participants. However, after the ban there was a steep decline in coverage of Sinn Féin and republican viewpoints, with television appearances being reduced to 34 times in the following year, and the delays and uncertainties caused by ambiguities, voice-overs and subtitles often lead to coverage and films being dropped entirely.

The BBC's Head of Editorial Policy, Richard Ayre, looked for ways to allow the continuation of news reporting on the subject, during a time when 'The Troubles' in Northern Ireland were a matter of great importance and interest. He established that the ban could not prevent the BBC's use of actors to speak Adams' and other Republicans' words. The net effect of the ban was to increase publicity.

October 1998: Richard Bacon cocaine controversy
On 18 October 1998, a presenter of the children's television programme Blue Peter, Richard Bacon, was in the headlines when it emerged he had taken cocaine. He was released from his BBC contract immediately.

2001–2010

2003–2004: Death of Dr David Kelly, Hutton Report, and Butler Report 
In May 2003, the defence correspondent of the BBC Radio 4 Today programme, Andrew Gilligan, quoted a government official who stated that the British government had "sexed up" a dossier concerning weapons of mass destruction in Iraq, against the wishes of the intelligence services. A newspaper report claimed that Alastair Campbell (the Prime Minister's Director of Communications and Strategy), was responsible. The government strongly denied the claims and this prompted an investigation by parliament.

A Ministry of Defence scientist, Dr David Kelly, was named as the alleged source of the news item, which led to official sources suggesting that Dr Kelly was not a credible source. The subsequent suicide of Dr Kelly resulted in an escalation of the conflict between the government and the BBC, during which both sides received severe criticism for their roles in the matter.

The publication in January 2004 of the Hutton Report into Dr Kelly's death was extremely critical of Andrew Gilligan, and of the corporation's management processes and standards of journalism. In the aftermath, both the chairman of the BBC Gavyn Davies and the Director-General Greg Dyke resigned, followed by Gilligan himself. Lord Hutton was accused of failing to take account of the imperfections inherent in journalism, while giving the government the benefit of the doubt over its own conduct. Large parts of the media branded the report a whitewash.

A second inquiry by Lord Butler of Brockwell did review the intelligence on weapons of mass destruction and the production of the dossier. Amongst other things, the Butler Report concluded that:
"... the fact that the reference [to the 45 minute claim] in the classified assessment was repeated in the dossier later led to suspicions that it had been included because of its eye-catching character."
Andrew Gilligan claims that the Butler Report vindicated his original story that the dossier had been "sexed up".

2004–2007: Balen Report

The BBC fought to overturn a ruling by the Information Tribunal that the BBC was wrong to refuse to release to a member of the public under the Freedom of Information Act of 2000 (FOI) the Balen report on its Middle East coverage. The report examines the BBC's coverage of the Arab–Israeli conflict.

On Friday 27 April 2007, the High Court rejected Steven Sugar's challenge to the Information Commissioner's decision. However, on 11 February 2009, the House of Lords (the UK's highest court) reinstated the Information Tribunal's decision to allow Mr Sugar's appeal against the Information Commissioner's decision. The matter goes back to the High Court for determination of the BBC's further appeal on a point of law against the Tribunal's decision.

The BBC's press release following the High Court judgement included the following statement:
"The BBC's action in this case had nothing to do with the fact that the Balen report was about the Middle East – the same approach would have been taken whatever area of news output was covered."

Mr Sugar was reported after his success in the House of Lords as saying:
"It is sad that the BBC felt it necessary to spend hundreds of thousands of pounds of public money fighting for three years to try to load the system against those requesting information from it. I am very pleased that the House of Lords has ruled that such obvious unfairness is not the result of the Act."

Steven Sugar died of cancer in January 2011, and it remains unclear what will happen with the legal battle. There is the possibility of someone picking up the case on Mr. Sugar's behalf. The Supreme Court says it has listed the case provisionally for another hearing in Autumn 2011.

2004–2011: Siemens outsourcing
In 2004, the BBC Governors approved a deal to outsource the BBC's IT, telephony and broadcast technology (which had previously been run by the corporation's internal BBC technology division) to the German engineering and electronics company Siemens IT Solutions and Services (SIS). It was claimed that the sale of BBC Technology would deliver over £30 million of savings to the BBC. In June 2007, a report published by the House of Commons Public Accounts Committee was critical of the deal, claiming that BBC management had omitted £60 million' worth of hidden costs in its application to the Board of Governors and that the profits to Siemens had not been taken into account. Recorded savings to the BBC had amounted to £22m, 38% lower than the BBC's original forecast.

The BBC's partnership with Siemens underwent some high-profile difficulties, including issues with the corporation-wide switchover to an IP telephony system in 2009; a major outage of the BBC website in 2011; and Siemens was the original technology partner in the Digital Media Initiative until its contract was terminated in 2009 (see below). In December 2010, SIS was acquired from Siemens by the French company Atos and BBC IT, broadcast and website systems are now managed by Atos.

March 2007: Blue Peter phone-in
A phone-in competition supporting Unicef, held by the children's programme Blue Peter in November 2006, was revealed to have been rigged. The winning caller in the competition was actually a visitor to the set who pretended to be calling from an outside line to select a prize. The competition was rigged because of a technical problem with receiving the calls. The controversy was the beginning of a wider controversy in which other broadcasters were fined for faking telephone competitions.

March 2007: BBC Jam
In 2006, the BBC launched a free educational website for children, BBC Jam, which cost £150 million. Following complaints by a number of commercial suppliers of educational software that the BBC was engaging in anti-competitive practices by providing this service for free, the BBC Trust announced that the website would be suspended pending a review. The following year it was decided that the service would not be relaunched and it was closed permanently.

July 2007: A Year with the Queen
In early 2007, the BBC commissioned RDF Media to make a behind-the-scenes film about the monarchy, titled Monarchy: The Royal Family at Work, for BBC One. A 60-second trailer was shown at the BBC1 autumn launch in London on 11 July. The trailer showed two clips of Queen Elizabeth II; one in which she tells photographer Annie Leibovitz that she will not remove her crown to make the scene look "less dressy", and another in which the Queen says "I'm not changing anything. I've done enough dressing like this".

The shots in the trailer were edited out of sequence, making it appear as if the Queen had abruptly left the photo shoot, when in fact, the second shot showed her entering the shoot. BBC 1 Controller Peter Fincham told journalists at the launch that it showed the monarch "losing it a bit and walking out in a huff".

The next day, newspapers and other media sources ran headlines stating that the Queen had stormed out during the session. On 12 July, the BBC released a formal apology to both the Queen and Leibovitz. On 16 July, RDF Media admitted it was "guilty of a serious error of judgement"; Fincham and RDF Media chief creative officer Stephen Lambert both resigned.

In October 2007, the BBC released the report of its investigation into the incident. The investigation concluded that nobody at the BBC "consciously set out to defame or misrepresent the Queen" and that there was never a possibility "that the misleading sequence could have been included in the finished documentary to be broadcast by the BBC" but that nonetheless "the incident reveal[ed] misjudgements, poor practice and ineffective systems as well, of course, as the usual helping of bad luck that often accompanies such sorry affairs."

September 2007: The Blue Peter cat
When the children's programme Blue Peter acquired a pet cat in January 2007, it held an internet vote to choose a name for the animal. In September of that year, it was revealed that viewers had selected the name Cookie, but producers changed the result to Socks instead, leading to accusations of breach of audience trust. An apology to viewers was subsequently made on the programme.

2008: The Russell Brand Show prank telephone calls row

In a show recorded on 16 October 2008 and broadcast two days later, Brand made several phone calls - along with guest Jonathan Ross - to the home of actor Andrew Sachs, claiming that Brand had sexual relations with his granddaughter Georgina Baillie, along with further apparently lewd suggestions. Later coverage in the Daily Mail newspaper led to number of complaints, and ultimately Ross left the corporation.

2009: Refusal to broadcast Gaza DEC Appeal 
On 22 January 2009, the BBC declined a request from the Disasters Emergency Committee (DEC) to screen an aid appeal intended to raise money to aid the relief effort following then recent hostilities in the Gaza Strip. Explanations cited by Mark Thompson, the BBC's then Director General raised doubts about the possibility of delivering aid in a volatile situation and highlighted the need to avoid any risk of compromising public confidence in the BBC's impartiality in the context of an ongoing news story.

Because of a lack of consensus among UK broadcasters, with British Sky Broadcasting announcing it would follow the BBC's view, TV channels in the UK initially decided not to broadcast the appeal. A public demonstration occurred outside Broadcasting House on 24 January with former cabinet minister Tony Benn attacking the decision in an interview on BBC News 24 during which he read out the appeal address, and alleging that the Israeli government was preventing the appeal from being broadcast.

The Guardian reported that the BBC faced a revolt from its journalists over the issue, and that they had been threatened with dismissal if they spoke out. In an editorial, the paper described the refusal to broadcast the appeal as 'taking a partisan stance' and an error of judgement.

Four days after the BBC refusal, ITV, Channel 4 and Five broadcast the appeal intact on 26 January. The BBC also broadcast substantial extracts from the appeal in its TV news programmes.

The BBC's decision came in for criticism across the political spectrum including from senior politicians such as Nick Clegg, Douglas Alexander and Hazel Blears and public figures like the Archbishops of York and Canterbury, although it was supported by other commentators such as Dominic Lawson.

On 25 January 2009, then Secretary of State for International Development Douglas Alexander supported the appeal telling Sky News: "My appeal is a much more straight forward one. People are suffering right now, many hundreds of thousands of people are without the basic necessities of life. That for me is a very straight forward case and I sincerely hope that the British people respond with characteristic generosity."

MP Richard Burden put forward an early day motion calling on the BBC to screen the appeal which received the support of 112 MPs. Meanwhile, another Labour MP, Gerald Kaufman, complained about "nasty pressure" on the BBC from Israeli lobbyists. However, Mark Thompson, the Director-General of the BBC, denied that the decision was due to Israeli pressure. Complaints to the BBC about the decision were directed to Mark Thompson's blog. BBC's Newsnight programme reported that the BBC had received over 15,000 complaints as well as 200 letters of support.

After the appeal was broadcast on Channel 4 on 26 January 2009, Niaz Alam resigned as an external member of the BBC's Appeals Advisory Committee in protest at the BBC's explanation of its refusal to broadcast the appeal, after news coverage gave the impression the whole of this committee had been party to the decision.

A version of his resignation letter, was published in Private Eye, defending the impartiality of the Disasters Emergency Committee's recommendation and criticising the BBC's refusal to broadcast the appeal. The letter also disputed the logic of the justification to block the appeal on grounds of impartiality by pointing out that 'the ultimate logic of a policy of avoiding appeals arising out of politically controversial conflicts would be for the BBC to ignore major humanitarian crises.'

Journalist and broadcaster Peter Oborne wrote and presented an edition of Channel 4's Dispatches titled "Inside Britain's Israel Lobby, " in which this controversy was featured as one small part towards the end, when he discussed the BBC's refusal to broadcast the 2009 DEC Gaza appeal with Niaz Alam.

The BBC Trust reported in its 'Decision of the BBC Trust' document on the appeal that, 'the BBC Executive had received about 40,000 complaints about the Director General's decision'. The BBC's chief operating officer, Caroline Thomson, affirmed the need to broadcast "without affecting and impinging on the audience's perception of our impartiality" and that in this case, it was a "real issue."

The 2009 Gaza appeal is the only occasion on which the BBC is known to have refused an appeal broadcast request from the DEC.

It is reported the 2009 DEC Gaza appeal screened only by Channel 4 and ITV raised £8.3m. In August 2014 ,the BBC broadcast a new DEC aid appeal for people in Gaza, without similar controversy, which raised £16m over two years.

2009: BNP Question Time appearance

Following the improved performance of the British National Party in the 2009 European elections, the BBC controversially changed its stance on the appearance of the BNP on the flagship current affairs talk show, Question Time, and invited party leader Nick Griffin to appear on its edition of 22 October 2009. The BBC was also obliged to transmit party political broadcasts by the BNP.

2008–2013: Digital Media Initiative

In 2008, the BBC launched the Digital Media Initiative (DMI), a technology programme intended to streamline broadcast operations by moving to a fully digital, tapeless production workflow at a cost of £81.7 million. It was forecast to deliver cost savings to the BBC of around £18 million. DMI was contracted out to the technology services provider Siemens with consulting by Deloitte.

Costs of the project rose after a number of technical problems and delays, and in 2009 the BBC terminated the contract with Siemens. BBC losses were estimated to be £38.2m, partially offset by a £27.5m settlement paid by Siemens, leaving a loss of £10.7m to the BBC. The BBC was criticised by the UK National Audit Office in 2011 for its handling of the project.

In 2009, the BBC brought the DMI project in-house and started work on a digital system to be known as Fabric. Lord Hall, the BBC's Director General, announced in late May 2013 that the project was to be abandoned after costs reached £98 million.

2009–2012: Denis Avey Claims
On 29 November 2009, BBC News Channel broadcast claims by Denis Avey that he smuggled himself into Monowitz concentration camp in 1944. These claims were presented as fact on the BBC website and became the subject of the best-selling book The Man Who Broke into Auschwitz, co-authored by Avey and BBC journalist Rob Broomby. Avey's claims generated considerable controversy, and were questioned in a number of newspapers. The BBC came under criticism for having broadcast these and for promoting the book. The BBC subsequently acknowledged the controversy in a subsequent programme.

2009–2014: Women in panel shows
In 2009, the actress and comedian Victoria Wood stated that BBC panel shows were too male-dominated, and involved "a lot of men topping each other".

In February 2014, the television executive Danny Cohen said that there would no longer be any all male comedy panel shows on the BBC and all shows must contain a woman. The journalist Caitlin Moran referred to tokenism already existing on such shows. Dara Ó Briain, host of BBC 2 panel show Mock the Week, also referred to tokenism and "token woman" speaking against this idea. Comedian Milton Jones called it "counterproductive".

Journalist Deborah Orr, although she also considered it "tokenistic", wrote in favour of the plan: "The issue of gender representation on panel games is comparatively trivial. But the fact is this: if comparatively trivial contemporary manifestations of long-standing disadvantage cannot be seen for what they are, and dealt with, but instead become bemired in trenchant opposition, what hope is there in tackling the vast, brutal and comprehensive ones."

2010–2019

2010: Weapons claims offend Bob Geldof, Ethiopia and Africa
In March 2010 Bob Geldof confronted Andrew Marr on a BBC report claiming the Ethiopian government used money raised for the famine to pay for weapons. Geldof and the Band Aid Trust reported the BBC to Ofcom over the incident. Development agency Christian Aid announced it too would make a complaint to the BBC Trust. The Ethiopian ambassador to the UK Berhanu Kebede called it a "disgrace" and a "ridiculous report" and said the BBC had "destroyed its credibility in Africa" by making such claims. Geldof said it would be a "tragedy" if British people refused to donate money due to the BBC claims.

The BBC initially announced that it was standing by its report and claimed to have evidence to back up its stance. The BBC was forced to broadcast a series of apologies in November 2010 after realising that it did not have enough evidence that any money was spent on weapons, basing much of the claims on a CIA report it had failed to question. It also apologised to Geldof for claiming that he had refused to respond to its fabricated story, with Geldof saying that much damage had been caused by the BBC to charity campaigns. Mr. Geldof also said "appalling damage" had been caused to the Band Aid Trust by the BBC.

2007–2011: Accusations of ageism and sexism
The BBC was accused of ageism and sexism when news presenter Moira Stuart (55) – the first black female television newsreader – was sacked in April 2007 after more than two decades of presenting, despite many male presenters in similar situations being allowed to continue in their jobs.
In November 2008, four female Countryfile presenters (Michaela Strachan, Charlotte Smith, Miriam O'Reilly and Juliet Morris), all in their 40s and 50s, were dismissed from the show.

The issue returned in July 2009, when former theatre choreographer Arlene Phillips (66) was replaced on the Strictly Come Dancing panel by Alesha Dixon, a pop-star half her age. The males on the show were Len Goodman (65), Bruno Tonioli (53), Craig Revel Horwood (44), and Bruce Forsyth (81).

Former Countryfile presenter Miriam O'Reilly claimed she was "warned about wrinkles", and won an employment tribunal against the corporation on the grounds of ageism and victimisation – but not sexism. With other older women also dropped by the BBC, Joan Bakewell claimed the BBC's policy was "damaging the position of older women in society", whilst former Liberal Democrat leader Menzies Campbell said that the BBC was obsessed with youth culture and was shallow thinking.

2010–2011: QI and Tsutomu Yamaguchi
In December 2010, the BBC broadcast an episode of its TV quiz show QI in which panellists made jokes during a discussion about Tsutomu Yamaguchi, who survived both atomic bombings of Hiroshima and Nagasaki in August 1945. Yamaguchi had died only earlier that year. The Japanese embassy in London wrote a letter of complaint to the BBC about the content of its quiz show after being alerted to the offensive content when viewers in Japan contacted diplomatic staff. Yamaguchi's daughter also made known how upset she was as a result of the comments broadcast on the BBC. She said that Britain, as a nuclear power, had no right to "look down" on her father.

In January 2011, the BBC issued an apology for "any offence caused" to Japan by the incident, recognising "the sensitivity of the subject matter for Japanese viewers". In February 2011, the BBC blamed a "strength of feeling" in Japan following its atomic bomb joke broadcast for the cancellation of the filming of part of its Planet Word documentary in Japan. The documentary was due to be presented by Stephen Fry, the host of QI.

2011: Top Gear comments on Mexico

On 30 January 2011, the BBC broadcast an episode of its motoring TV show Top Gear during which presenters referred to Mexicans as both "lazy" and "feckless" and Mexican food as "refried sick". The broadcast caused many complaints in Mexico, including in newspapers and websites, while a motion of censure was considered in the Mexican senate and the BBC Spanish-language website BBC Mundo received protests. Jeremy Clarkson, one of the presenters, expressed doubt that there would be any complaints against them as, he alleged, the Mexican ambassador would be asleep.

British MPs described the comments as "ignorant, derogatory and racist" and called on the BBC to say it was sorry. Mexico's ambassador in London also requested that the BBC say it was sorry for the "offensive, xenophobic and humiliating" comments. The legal firm who previously pursued the media in the Shilpa Shetty case involving comments in Big Brother have engaged clients for the case.

The BBC then offered an apology, though it claimed there was no "vindictiveness" in the remarks and that they were just part of the stereotype-based comedy the organisation espoused, such as when it "make[s] jokes about the Italians being disorganised and over dramatic, the French being arrogant and the Germans being over-organised". Trevor Phillips, head of the Equality and Human Rights Commission, told The Sunday Times that he was "not going to get hot under the collar about schoolboy provocation which frankly is organised so that we can get into a ruck and sell more DVDs for Jeremy Clarkson – Jeremy is rich enough".

Fake child labour footage in Bangalore
The BBC's then nearly 60-year-old flagship weekly current affairs programme Panorama had aired a documentary claiming that Bangalore-based suppliers of Primark, a hugely successful retailer with 220 stores across Europe, were using child labour in their production in 2008. The claim has been found to be untrue and the BBC apologised to Primark admitting its mistake. Responding to Primark's protest, the BBC conceded in a 49-page report that footage of three boys engaged in completing garments for Primark was "more likely than not" to have been "not genuine" after a three-year internal inquiry.

UEFA Euro 2012 in Poland and Ukraine

During the UEFA Euro 2012 football tournament in Poland and Ukraine, the BBC current affairs programme Panorama aired Euro 2012: Stadiums of Hate, which discussed racism in the sport. It included recent footage of supporters chanting various xenophobic slogans and displays of white power symbols and banners in Poland, as well as Nazi salutes and the beating of a few South Asians in Ukraine. The documentary was widely commented in the British press, but later criticised for being one-sided, sensationalist and unethical. The critics included other British media outlets, Polish anti-racism campaigners and black and Jewish community leaders in Poland. Polish and Ukrainian politicians and journalists, British fans visiting Poland and Ukraine and Gary Lineker also voiced similar concerns about the broadcast.

The executive director of the Jewish Community Centre of Kraków, Jonathan Ornstein, a Jewish source used in the film said: "I am furious at the way the BBC has exploited me as a source. The organization used me and others to manipulate the serious subject of anti-Semitism for its own sensationalist agenda... the BBC knowingly cheated its own audience – the British people – by concocting a false horror story about Poland. In doing so, the BBC has spread fear, ignorance, prejudice and hatred. I am profoundly disturbed by this unethical form of journalism."

The Guardian reported: "Other sources have come forward to say that an interview with a Jewish Israeli player was also cut from the programme because he failed to confirm Panorama's "anti-semitism" thesis. The BBC interviewed midfielder Aviram Baruchian, who plays for the Polish team Polonia Warsaw. One source who was present said the Panorama journalists had complained afterwards that the interview was "useless". Panorama strongly denies this.

Despite the BBC warning, Poland and Ukraine fans were not exhibiting racist attitudes. By the end of the tournament however, four other nations were fined by UEFA for the racist activities of their fans: Germany, Spain, Croatia and Russia.

June 2012: Diamond Jubilee coverage
The BBC's live television coverage of the Queen's Diamond Jubilee River Thames Pageant on 3 June 2012 attracted some criticism in the media, and the corporation reportedly received over 4500 complaints from members of the public about the broadcast. Criticism centred on the "informal" style of presentation which was perceived by some commentators to be too lowbrow for a royal occasion. Some reviewers thought that the BBC presenters had concentrated too much on interviewing celebrities and that they were insufficiently prepared to add depth to the TV commentary.

The actor and writer Stephen Fry was of the opinion that the coverage was "mind-numbingly tedious", and BBC radio presenter Sue MacGregor expressed disappointment that the coverage had failed to provide sufficient historical context to viewers. Poet Laureate Carol Ann Duffy and composer Gavin Greenaway publicly criticised the lack of television coverage given to the music which had been specially commissioned for the event. BBC creative director Alan Yentob defended the BBC's coverage, citing high audience approval ratings, and Director-General of the BBC Mark Thompson congratulated BBC staff for their work on the broadcast.

October 2012: Jimmy Savile abuse scandal

In early October 2012, it was found that a Newsnight investigation to allegations of sexual abuse by the late Jimmy Savile had been shelved shortly before it was due to be broadcast. On 11 October George Entwistle, the Director-General of the BBC, directed the head of BBC Scotland, Ken MacQuarrie, to commence an investigation into why this program was cancelled, He also announced an investigation into the BBC's child protection policy, and another into the prevalent culture within the department, particularly at the time of Savile's employment.

On 23 October 2012, Entwistle appeared before the Culture, Media and Sport Committee to answer questions following revelations that Savile had abused children on BBC property while working for the BBC. When asked by committee chairman John Whittingdale if the BBC's reputation for trust and integrity was in jeopardy, Entwistle stated that allegations of child abuse at the BBC were a "very, very grave matter". A Panorama investigation reported on what they considered to have been a paedophile ring that might have operated for at least 20 years, and possibly as long as 40 years, and BBC World Affairs editor John Simpson described it as the BBC's "biggest crisis for over 50 years".

On 12 November, the BBC announced that its director of news Helen Boaden was "stepping aside", together with her deputy Steve Mitchell, prior to the outcome of an investigation into the Savile child abuse claims. Nick Pollard's report into the shelving of a Newsnight report on Savile in 2011 was published on 19 December 2012. It concluded that the decision to drop the original report was "flawed", but that it had not been done to protect programmes prepared as tributes to Savile. Pollard's report criticised George Entwistle for apparently failing to read emails warning him of Savile's "dark side", and stated that, after the allegations against Savile eventually became public, the BBC fell into a "level of chaos and confusion [that] was even greater than was apparent at the time". The BBC announced that Newsnight editor Peter Rippon and deputy editor Liz Gibbons would be replaced, and that deputy director of news Steve Mitchell had resigned, but that Helen Boaden would return to her role.

On 21 January 2013, the BBC News website ran a story that revealed that the BBC had received 216 complaints for their children's channel CBeebies having shown a repeat of a cancelled children's programme called Tweenies the previous day, that showed a character impersonating Jimmy Savile by wearing a blonde wig, mimicking Savile's accent and using Savile's catchphrase "Now then, guys and gals". Government communications industry regulatory body Ofcom said it had received "tens" of complaints as well. The episode had been made in 2001, over a decade before the scandal came to light, and the programme had ended production entirely in 2003. The BBC responded with the following:

"This morning CBeebies broadcast a repeat of an episode of the Tweenies, originally made in 2001, featuring a character dressed as a DJ impersonating Jimmy Savile. This programme will not be repeated and we are very sorry for any offence caused."

November 2012: Lord McAlpine falsely implicated in child abuse scandal
In the aftermath of the Jimmy Savile scandal, Newsnight investigated the North Wales child abuse scandal. On 2 November 2012, a former resident of the Bryn Estyn children's home was reported on Newsnight claiming that a prominent, but unnamed, former Conservative politician had sexually abused him during the 1970s. The rumour was spread by users of Twitter and other social media which identified the politician. After The Guardian reported a possible case of mistaken identity, Lord McAlpine issued a strong denial that he was in any way involved, asserting that the allegations were wholly false and seriously defamatory. The accuser unreservedly apologised, admitting that, as soon as he saw a photograph of the individual, he realised he had been mistaken. The BBC also apologised.

However McAlpine about whom the claims were made, began legal proceedings against the broadcasters who made allegations about him, eventually settling for £185,000 from the BBC and £125,000 from ITV. In a subsequent libel case, Sally Bercow, wife of John Bercow, Speaker of the House of Commons, was prosecuted for libel regarding her Twitter posting which named McAlpine. Following a High Court verdict in favour of the plaintiff, where Bercow's comment was found to have been defamatory, she paid undisclosed damages to McAlpine.

The decision to broadcast the Newsnight report without contacting its subject led to further criticism of the BBC, and the resignation of its Director-General, George Entwistle on 10 November. It was later announced that Entwistle's severance package was in excess of £1.3 million. Harriet Harman, Labour's Shadow Secretary of State for Culture, Media and Sport, declared that Entwistle had been rewarded for 'failure'.

July 2013: Executive payoffs
The large severance payments given to departing BBC executives came to widespread media attention in 2013 when the National Audit Office conducted an investigation into BBC senior management pay. The practice had been going on for a number of years. Senior executives whose payments were criticised included: chief operating officer Caroline Thomson, who received a total of £680,400 on her departure in 2011; Deputy Director-General Mark Byford who also left the BBC in 2011, taking £949,000; CEO of BBC Worldwide John Smith who was paid a total of £1,031,000 in 2011 (he later returned £205,000); George Entwistle who left the Director-General job after only 54 days following the Savile crisis, and received a payment of £511,500; and Roly Keating, the head of BBC Archives, who received a £375,000 severance payment in 2012 (which he later repaid in full). Margaret Hodge, chair of the Public Accounts Committee, criticised the practice, calling it an "outrageous waste of licence fee payers' money." Following his appointment as Director General, Lord Hall introduced a £150,000 cap on severance payments. Mark Thompson stated to the PAC that the payments had been fully approved by the BBC Trust.

November 2013: Generation War
BBC plans to broadcast the German ZDF film Generation War upset certain British residents of Polish origin, as the film had already been accused of slandering the Polish anti-Nazi underground Armia Krajowa as anti-Semites, and of portraying false stereotypes of Poles and Germans during the period of occupation. In Germany, after ambassador Jerzy Marganski sent a letter of complaint to ZDF, the broadcaster provided corrective actions producing and broadcasting film 'Kampf ums Überleben'.

August 2014: Coverage of Cliff Richard's property search
On 14 August 2014, Sir Cliff Richard's apartment in Berkshire was searched by South Yorkshire Police in relation to an alleged historical sexual assault on a boy aged under 16. After police tipped off BBC journalist Dan Johnson, BBC reporters were on the scene as police arrived, and a BBC helicopter covered the raid as it happened. Richard, who was in Portugal at the time, released a statement asserting that the allegation was "completely false" and complained that the press appeared to have been given advance notice of the search – whereas he had not been. The BBC's home affairs correspondent, Danny Shaw, stated that the media presence at Richard's home "was highly unusual – it appears to be a deliberate attempt by police to ensure maximum coverage", but added: "That's not illegal – but there are strict guidelines." South Yorkshire Police initially denied leaking details of the property search, but later confirmed that they had been "working with a media outlet" about the investigation.

By 19 August, the BBC claimed to have received up to 594 complaints regarding the coverage. Barrister and broadcaster Geoffrey Robertson questioned the legality of the search and called for an independent inquiry into the police operation and the prior leaking to media of the property search. Former Attorney General Dominic Grieve accused the police of having a "collusive relationship" with the BBC, claiming that the decision to tip off the BBC "seems quite extraordinary." Officials from the BBC and South Yorkshire Police were called before the Home Affairs Select Committee on 2 September. There, the chief constable of South Yorkshire Police accused the BBC of "extortion"; however, MPs dismissed this, with chairman Keith Vaz stating that the BBC had "acted perfectly properly" in its coverage of the raid.

After being told he would not be charged in June 2016, Richard said that he was considering suing the BBC. The BBC apologised for "distress" caused by its coverage but stood by the story as it believed it was in the public interest. Richard sued the BBC and was awarded £210,000 in damages in July 2018 after London's High Court ruled that the broadcaster had infringed his right to privacy.

September 2014: Coverage of Scottish independence campaign

Throughout the campaign preceding the Scottish independence referendum held on 18 September 2014, there were accusations claiming that the BBC was neither neutral nor impartial.

On 14 September 2014, thousands of protesters demonstrated outside BBC Scotland's headquarters in Glasgow accusing the corporation and its political editor Nick Robinson of broadcasting “lies” and of being “biased” against the Yes Scotland campaign. The demonstrators demanded that Robinson be dismissed. The 'Yes' campaign was not itself involved in the demonstration. The protestors also later complained that coverage about the demonstration was not broadcast by the BBC.

Alex Salmond, Scotland's First Minister and leader of the Scottish National Party, agreed with the view that the BBC was biased in favour of retaining the union. However, in an interview given after his clash with Robinson, he said he believed it was the fault of the BBC's London-based staff rather than BBC Scotland itself.

Professor John Robertson and a team at the University of the West of Scotland monitored news broadcasts of the BBC and ITV until September 2013 for their study Fairness in the First Year. The report found that the BBC was biased against the 'Yes' campaign in matters of airtime, sequencing of news items, prevalence of "bad news" items, and misleading presentation of sources as impartial. John Boothman, BBC Scotland's head of news and current affairs, rejected Robertson's accusation that the BBC had suppressed coverage of the report, while Ken MacQuarrie, director of BBC Scotland, rejected the report's allegations.

January 2015: Tim Willcox antisemitism allegation 
While covering a unity rally after the antisemitic massacre at a Hypercacher kosher supermarket in Paris and Charlie Hebdo terror attack, on 11 January 2015, the BBC's Tim Willcox interrupted the daughter of a Holocaust survivor discussing antisemitism in France by saying: "Many critics though, of Israel’s policy would suggest that the Palestinians suffer hugely at Jewish hands as well". After widespread criticism from the Jewish community for appearing to impute responsibility for Israel's actions to all Jews as a whole (in his use of the phrase "Jewish hands") and to justify the antisemitic massacre, Willcox apologised; Willcox had also received criticism months before for appearing to claim that many Jews disliked Ed Miliband because of "mansion tax" he had proposed. The BBC Trust ruled that Willcox's behaviour did not violate its editorial guidelines.

March 2015: Jeremy Clarkson's contract
On 11 March 2015, the BBC suspended Jeremy Clarkson after a reported altercation with a producer. It was later established that Clarkson, in a "fracas", had punched producer Oisín Tymon during an argument over catering arrangements at the Top Gear production crew's hotel. A petition on change.org to reinstate Clarkson gained over one million signatories before it was delivered to the BBC.

On 25 March 2015, the BBC announced that Jeremy Clarkson's Top Gear contract would not be renewed and that he would be dropped from the programme. After an internal investigation, the final decision had been taken by Tony Hall, director general of the BBC. This development led the other Top Gear presenters, Richard Hammond and James May, to support Clarkson by quitting Top Gear themselves (by allowing their BBC contracts to expire at the end of March without renewal).

January 2016: co-ordinated on-air resignation of Stephen Doughty

In January 2016, the team behind the BBC's Daily Politics show co-ordinated the on-air resignation of Labour politician Stephen Doughty shortly before the start of Prime Minister's Questions. The show's output editor Andrew Alexander wrote a (later deleted) blog post for the BBC website explaining how this had come about. Alexander wrote: "We knew his resignation just before PMQs would be a dramatic moment with big political impact". The timing of the announcement ensured Labour leader Jeremy Corbyn was caught off guard. BBC News political editor Laura Kuenssberg "sealed the deal" with Doughty before filming, even though it appeared to viewers that the resignation had been unplanned. A camera crew even filmed Doughty and Kuenssberg arriving at the studio together in advance of the announcement, this to televise later on news bulletins.

2017 and 2018: Gender pay gap controversy

In July 2017, in response to a demand from the UK government as a condition of its new royal charter, the BBC published a list of all employees who earned more than £150,000. Of the 96 BBC employees making over this threshold, 62 were men and 34 were women, and of the seven highest earners, all were men. The disclosure prompted criticism of the BBC over the gender pay gap; other critics also criticised a lack of ethnic diversity among the highest-earning BBC personalities.

Early in January 2018, it was announced that Carrie Gracie, the BBC's China editor, had resigned from the role because of the salary gender disparity. A pre-broadcast conversation between Today presenter John Humphrys and Jon Sopel, the BBC's North America editor, was leaked a few days later. Humphrys was recorded joking about the disparity. BBC management itself was said to be "deeply unimpressed" with Humphrys' comments.

It became known on 26 January that some of the BBC's leading male presenters would take a pay cut. According to the BBC's media editor Amol Rajan, Huw Edwards, Jeremy Vine, and John Humphrys were among those to have agreed to a salary reduction.

2019: Naga Munchetty accused of breaching BBC rules
In September 2019, the BBC upheld a complaint against Naga Munchetty for having breached BBC rules by giving an opinion on comments made by Donald Trump. Munchetty was reprimanded by the BBC for breaching its charter. After representations in her favour from many sources, Munchetty was cleared by Lord Hall, who commented: "racism is racism and the BBC is not impartial on the topic".

2019: Removal of audience laughter from Question Time footage in a news report
In a special Question Time leaders' debate held on 22 November 2019 ahead of that year's UK general election, the leader of the Conservative Party and the Prime Minister of the UK Boris Johnson was met with a question from an audience member about being honest in Johnson's position. The question was subsequently followed by laughter and applause from the rest of the audience, while Johnson struggled to answer.

The footage from the moment was largely untouched (complete with sound) in a report broadcast during that night's BBC News at Ten, but in another report about the same debate aired during the shorter Saturday lunchtime bulletin the next day, the laughter had been removed from the footage. A user on Twitter raised attention to the difference. Journalist Peter Oborne compared the incident to the censorship in Soviet television, while BBC News presenter Huw Edwards defended that it was an error rather than a conspiracy.

The BBC had initially defended the decision, claiming it was for timing reasons. However, the corporation later admitted that it was a "mistake".

2020–present

2020: Emily Maitlis remarks on the Dominic Cummings coronavirus controversy

During the COVID-19 lockdown, it emerged that Dominic Cummings, chief adviser to Prime Minister Boris Johnson, had travelled from London to his parents house in County Durham. Cummings defended his actions and received the backing of Johnson, sparking accusations of double standards in the enforcement of the lockdown. On 26 May, Emily Maitlis, host of BBC's Newsnight, delivered a highly critical direct-to-camera piece about the affair, stating that "Dominic Cummings broke the rules, the country can see that, and it's shocked the government cannot... He made those who struggled to keep to the rules feel like fools, and has allowed many more to assume they can now flout them. The prime minister knows all this, but despite the resignation of one minister, growing unease from his backbenchers, a dramatic early warning from the polls, and a deep national disquiet, Boris Johnson has chosen to ignore it. Tonight, we consider what this blind loyalty tells us about the workings of Number 10." The piece was criticised as being unduly biased and unsuitable for an impartial broadcaster. The BBC later stated that the piece "did not meet our standards of due impartiality".

2020: Churchill Bengal famine comments 
In 2020, a BBC News at Ten report featured Indian historian Rudrangshu Mukherjee saying that the former British prime minister Winston Churchill was "seen as the precipitator of mass killing" due to allegations of his failure in the Bengal famine of 1943. Claims of anti-South Asian racism were also made against Churchill by Oxford University professor Yasmin Khan.

Historians Tirthankar Roy and James Holland criticised the accuracy of the report. The historian Max Hastings also criticised the report for failing to contextualise Churchill's actions and former Panorama journalist Tom Mangold of uncritically endorsing a "woke" view of Churchill as a racist.

2020: Usage of the word 'Nigger' in a news report 
In 2020, a BBC News report included usage of the racial slur nigger. 18,600 complaints were made, leading the BBC to apologise on August 9th of that year.

2021: Coverage of the death of Prince Philip
In the days following the death of Prince Philip, the BBC received over 100,000 complaints, a record number for British television, accusing BBC of excessive coverage and its perceived attempt to manufacture a largely absent national grief.

2021: Princess of Wales interview
In 2021, accusations were made that former BBC interviewer Martin Bashir had lied to gain his 1995 interview with Diana, Princess of Wales. Both of Diana's sons, Prince William and Prince Harry, released statements condemning Bashir and saying his practices were unethical. Scotland Yard said that they would assess what had happened to see if a criminal investigation was needed. As a result of the controversy, Lord Hall, former BBC director general resigned as the Chairman of the National Gallery.

2021: Tala Halawa controversy 
In May 2021, the media reported that Tala Halawa, who joined the BBC in 2017 and was reporting on the Israeli-Palestinian conflict, had posted anti-Israel and anti-Semitic tweets in 2014. Among her postings, Halawa had tweeted "#Hitler was right" and "Zionists can't get enough of our blood". As Halawa was reporting on the 2021 Israeli-Palestinian Crisis, doubts about her credibility as a neutral and objective reporter were raised.  In June 2021, the BBC announced that Halawa no longer worked for the BBC without providing further details. Halawa later issued a written statement, in which she blamed her dismissal on "external pro-Israel interest groups," and "pro-Israel censorship campaigns", and said that she had been dismissed due to the desire to "eliminate Palestinians from public life." She also said in the statement that she had been targeted by “pro-Israel groups” because she had “recently published a video report for the corporation about celebrities being criticized trolled and canceled for supporting Palestinian self-determination”.

2021: "We're being pressured into sex by some trans women" controversy

2021: Coverage of antisemitic incident in Oxford Street 
BBC online coverage of an incident in Oxford Street, in which a group of men were filmed spitting, shouting verbal abuse and in one case making a Nazi salute at a privately hired bus carrying Jewish youths celebrating Chanukkah, claimed that racial slurs about Muslims could be heard inside the bus. This was later amended to state that a single "slur about Muslims" could be heard on the video. The revised claim of even a single slur was dismissed by the Metropolitan Police and vehemently rejected by the party on the bus, who stated that the alleged slur in English was in fact a call for help in Hebrew ( - ! - "Call someone, it's urgent!"). Parents of the victims in the bus accused the BBC of "demonis(ing) our children".  The Board of Deputies of British Jews called on the BBC to apologise for the offending content. A protest outside Broadcasting House about the BBC coverage was subsequently organised by the Campaign Against Antisemitism on 13 December 2021.

On 26 January 2022, the Executive Complaints Unit issued a ruling that determining that “The online article as it stands must now be regarded as no longer meeting the BBC’s standards of due accuracy and, to the extent that the anti-Muslim slur claim has become controversial, it also lacks due impartiality in failing to reflect alternative views.” The report also asserted that while the reference to the slur was included "in good faith" after an “unusually high level of consultation among colleagues”, the BBC had failed to acknowledge the disputed nature of the phrase in question and had stonewalled the Jewish community's inquiries into the matter. On 3 February 2022, the BBC issued a further apology and acknowledged factually incorrect elements of its ECU report, which had incorrectly asserted that a member of the Community Security Trust had "verified" the BBC's interpretation of the phrase in question.

On 26 January 2022, after the ECU announced its report, Ofcom announced that it would conduct its own further investigation of the BBC over its handling of the incident and its aftermath. In November 2022, Ofcom stated in its report on the matter: “The BBC made a serious editorial misjudgment by not reporting on air, at any point, that the claim it had made about anti-Muslim slurs was disputed, once new evidence emerged. This failure to respond promptly and transparently created an impression of defensiveness by the BBC among the Jewish community.”

2022: Throwing a Paddy
In October 2022 in an online review of the Manchester United vs Tottenham match Cristiano Ronaldo was accused of throwing a Paddy in a BBC sports blog by Phil McNulty, when Ronaldo refused to come off the bench. The outdated phrase means an over the top reaction. This incident came a few weeks after the BBC accused the Republic of Ireland's women's football team of racism, when a video of the team singing "up the RA" emerged. The BBC has refused to apologise but has removed the phrase "throwing a Paddy" from its match review.

2023: Gary Lineker suspension
In March 2023, Gary Lineker, a sports presenter for the BBC, made a controversal tweet in which he compared the wording in the British government's "Illegal Migration Bill" to the rhetoric of Germany in the 1930s. He was subsequently suspended for what the BBC said was a violation of its impartiality policy. With other sports presenters supporting Lineker by refusing to work, the BBC changed the format of its sports output, including shortening Match of the Day and broadcasting it with crowd noise rather than a commentary.

See also

 Criticism of the BBC

Other channels:
 Al Jazeera controversies and criticism
 CBS News controversies and criticism
 CNN controversies
 Fox News controversies
 MSNBC controversies
 The New York Times controversies

Notes

References

External links
 The BBC Under Pressure – A history of controversial incidents through BBC News history.

 
Censorship of broadcasting in the United Kingdom
Journalism controversies by media organ
Lists of controversies
Political controversies in television
Television controversies in the United Kingdom